Hapanlohko is a traditional Karelian dish, made out of potato and rye bread dough. The dough is stored in a wooden sourdough pot before being baked into bread. However some dough is removed first to make Hapanlohko. The dough is boiled in a pot with peeled potatoes, thus completing the recipe.

External links 
 THL, Hapanlohkon ravintotekijät
 lappeenranta.fi, Säkkijärvi jätti makunsa perinnöksi Ylämaan koululaisille 

Finnish cuisine